John Ledwidge (28 September 1934 – 24 November 2018) was an Australian rules footballer who played with South Melbourne in the Victorian Football League (VFL).

Notes

External links 

1934 births
Australian rules footballers from Victoria (Australia)
Sydney Swans players
2018 deaths